Someday We’ll Tell Each Other Everything is a 2023 German drama film directed by Emily Atef, starring  and . The film based on the novel of the same name by Daniela Krien is set in 1990 in former East Germany and follows a young woman who begins a relationship with a charismatic farmer twice her age.

It is selected to compete for the Golden Bear at the 73rd Berlin International Film Festival, where it had its world premiere on 17 February 2023. It is scheduled to release in cinemas on 13 April 2023.

Synopsis
It is the summer of 1990, the Berlin Wall has fallen and it is the last summer in the GDR before reunification. Maria, a delicate, dreamy eighteen year-old girl, lives with her boyfriend Johannes on his parents' farm, the Brendel-Hof. It is next to the Henner-Hof the largest farm in town, where a solitary harsh-natured man lives. His idiosyncratic charisma and attractiveness to women, make it hard for him to socialize. Maria meets him by chance and a single touch is enough to start a tragic love in a changing country.

Cast
  as Maria
  as Henner
 Cedric Eich as Johannes Brendel
 Silke Bodenbender as Marianne
 Christine Schorn as Frieda Brendel
 Peter Schneider as Volker
 Victoria Mayer as Gisela
 Jördis Triebel as Hannah
 Tom Quaas	as Lindenwirth 
 German von Beug as Lukas Brendel 
 Petra Kalkutschke as Oma Traudel 
 Stephanie Petrowitz as Sabine 
 Christian Erdmann	as Hartmut 
 Philippine Pachl as Franzi 
 Peter Rauch as Egon 
 Anni Kaltwasser as Paula 
 Raffaela Lanci as Jugendliche 
 Lasse Gräntzel as Teenager

Production
Based on Daniela Krien’s novel of the same name, the film is set in the summer of 1990 in the countryside around Thuringia, in former East Germany. Produced by Karsten Stöter for Row Pictures, the cast features Marlene Burow and Felix Kramer.

The film was shot from 15 June 2022 to 27 July 2022 in Thuringia, state of central Germany.

Release
Someday We'll Tell Each Other Everything had its  premiere on 17 February 2023 as part of the 73rd Berlin International Film Festival, in Competition. It is scheduled to release in cinemas on 13 April 2023.

Reception

On the review aggregator Rotten Tomatoes website, the film has an approval rating of 43% based on 7 reviews, with an average rating of 6/10. On Metacritic, it has a weighted average score of 67 out of 100 based on 5 reviews, indicating "Generally Favorable Reviews".

Peter Bradshaw of The Guardian rated the film with 4 stars out of 5 and wrote, "It’s a vehement movie, with a driving narrative force and a robust sense of time and place." Guy Lodge reviewing at Berlin Film Festival, for Variety wrote, Beyond the festival circuit, this pretty but somewhat dreary mood piece is unlikely to end up on many people’s radars at all. Concluding, Lodge quotes dialogue of the protagonist Maria's mother, “Life can be very painful, but it will pass,” as she warns her, and Lodge then writes, "The film waits it out." Jordan Mintzer for The Hollywood Reporter stating that the film is "fraught with passion and platitudes", opined that it "veers toward caricature midway through, never to find its way again". He concluded, "A movie that starts off as an intriguing and well-observed coming-of-age drama, until it opts for the bedroom over the bigger picture." Writing for Cineuropa, Davide Abbatescianni billed it as "a sappy coming-of-age melodrama" which sports "cheesy dialogues, slow pacing, a rather over-explanatory approach when dealing with the period it covers, many relatives whose presence does not add anything to the development of the plot - such as the lost son who fled to the West, and returns home with his wife and kids - and a communist Pioneers childhood song performed by Maria out of the blue, among other things." Jonathan Romney for ScreenDaily wrote in review that the film is "Atef’s new film, a small-scale drama nevertheless attaining novelistic richness, stands to be her most successful yet, especially given contemporary demand for intelligent stories told from a perspective of female desire." Steph Green writing for British Film Institute graded the film 3/5 and wrote, "But for all its beauty and sexual slipperiness, the film trips itself up with juvenile plot developments ripped from a romance paperback."

Accolades

References

External links
 
 
 Someday We’ll Tell Each Other Everything at Berlinale
 Someday We’ll Tell Each Other Everything at Film portal 
 

2023 films
2023 drama films
German drama films
2020s German-language films
2020s German films
Films set in 1990
Films set in East Germany
Films shot in Germany
Arte France Cinéma films